Complete results for Women's Super-G competition at the 2011 World Championships. It ran on February 8 at 11:00 local time, the first race of the championships. 49 athletes from 20 countries competed.

Results

References

Super-G, women's
2011 in German women's sport
FIS